The Magic of Ordinary Days is a Hallmark Hall of Fame production based on a novel of the same name by Ann Howard Creel and adapted as a teleplay by Camille Thomasson.   It was directed by Brent Shields, produced by Andrew Gottlieb and stars Keri Russell, Skeet Ulrich, and Mare Winningham.

The film first aired on CBS on January 30, 2005, and received an encore broadcast on the same network exactly five years later.

Plot
Set during WWII, Olivia Dunne ‘Livvy’ is a young Denver woman who has become pregnant by a naval flight instructor on furlough. Embarrassed by his daughter's out of wedlock pregnancy, her father quietly arranges for her to marry. 

Livvy is sent to a rural southeastern Colorado town to marry Ray Singleton, who operates his family farm. Hearing of Livvy's dilemma from his pastor, Ray is moved and agrees to marry without even having met her. Unbeknownst to Livvy, he has lost both of his parents, and also his younger brother, during the attack on Pearl Harbor. Though young, handsome and a family man at heart, Ray has little opportunity to find a wife in this remote region. His sister Martha, her husband and their three children are the only family he has left.

Ray and Livvy are very different. Livvy has a good education and until recently had been studying archeology in graduate school. She knows nothing of cooking or farming and is not particularly religious. Livvy has felt bereft and lonely since her mom's death. Ray is a man of few words. A hard worker, he is kind, honest and patient. Family life and faith in God have been the central features of Ray's life. His daily activity is focused on working his family's farm. Livvy and Ray strive hard to be polite and courteous to each other, but are nevertheless awkward in each other's company.

Though agreeing to marry for her father, Livvy never intended to remain. She secretly writes to Lieutenant Edward Brown, the baby's father. A visit by her sister brings sharp contrast between the life Livvy came from and the life she is living now, but it is also apparent how much Livvy has changed her view of her surroundings. Her sister has no news of Lt. Brown, who has yet to answer Livvy's letters. 

Now, without her husband who has been called up to serve, her sister is lonely. She asks Livvy to leave Ray to come stay with her, suggesting they make up stories of him drinking and being violent to justify it. Livvy cannot do this, as he is a decent man.

As most young men are at war, Ray's farm is lacking in farm hands. The government supplies laborers to the farms, needing to maintain production of food. Ray's farm is supplemented by Japanese Americans interned at nearby Camp Amache. Livvy, feeling isolated and alone, befriends two sisters from the camp, Florence and Rose Umahara. Both are well-educated, and Livvy finds familiarity and comfort in their friendship.

Ray's sister Martha and her family give Livvy insight into rural America. Throughout Ray proves to be a caring husband, both patient and supportive. He quietly does things to make her more comfortable, and is much brighter than Livvy had first suspected. 

Livvy comes to value the life people like Martha and Ray lead. The love and forbearance shown to her stand in marked contrast with what she had known since her mother's passing. With the baby coming, she finally hears back from the lieutenant, who insists he couldn't be the father. Livvy realises Ray and she will have a good life and chooses to stay.

Reception
The premiere broadcast on CBS in 2005 attracted 18.7 million viewers, making it the highest-rated television film since the 2001-02 season. According to the author of the original novel, "as of early 2009, the screenplay for a sequel has been written and approved.  Hallmark Hall of Fame is waiting for principal actors to become available to begin production and filming."

In 2005, Robert Bianco of USA Today gave the film  (3½ out of 4 stars), saying:
If only TV movies this good were ordinary events....Days does sometimes stress a link between "country" and "uncomplicated" that probably never existed. But underneath the contrasts between Ray's simple ways and Livvy's more cultured upbringing is a binding, universal message about the need to accept the consequences of our acts. An ordinary lesson, perhaps, but it takes an extraordinary movie to make us listen.

References

External links
 

Hallmark Hall of Fame episodes
Films set in the 1940s
Films set in Colorado
Films about the internment of Japanese Americans
2005 television films
2005 films
2000s romance films
Films based on American novels
Films based on romance novels
2000s English-language films